The Essential Roy Orbison is a compilation album by American singer-songwriter Roy Orbison, released on March 28, 2006. It is part of Sony BMG's Essential series of compilation albums and includes tracks of Orbison's biggest hits from 1956 to 1992.

Track listing

Disc one

Disc two

Charts

Certifications

Release history

References 

Roy Orbison compilation albums
2006 compilation albums
Sony Music compilation albums
Monument Records compilation albums
Legacy Recordings compilation albums
2006 greatest hits albums